Sulfopropanediol 3-dehydrogenase (DHPS 3-dehydrogenase (sulfolactate forming), 2,3-dihydroxypropane-1-sulfonate 3-dehydrogenase (sulfolactate forming), dihydroxypropanesulfonate 3-dehydrogenase, hpsN (gene)) is an enzyme with systematic name (R)-2,3-dihydroxypropane-1-sulfonate:NAD+ 3-oxidoreductase. This enzyme catalyses the following chemical reaction

 (R)-2,3-dihydroxypropane-1-sulfonate + 2 NAD+ + H2O  (R)-3-sulfolactate + 2 NADH + 2 H+

The enzyme is involved in degradation of (R)-2,3-dihydroxypropanesulfonate.

References

External links 
 

EC 1.1.1